Lorenzo Ferrero (born 1951) is an Italian composer, librettist, author, and book editor. He started composing at an early age and has written over a hundred compositions thus far, including twelve operas, three ballets, and numerous orchestral, chamber music, solo instrumental, and vocal works. His musical idiom is characterized by eclecticism, stylistic versatility, and a neo-tonal language.

Biography
Born in Turin, he studied composition from 1969 to 1973 with Massimo Bruni and Enore Zaffiri at Turin Music Conservatory, and philosophy with Gianni Vattimo and Massimo Mila at the University of Turin, earning a degree in aesthetics with a thesis on John Cage in 1974.

His early interest in the psychology of perception and psychoacoustics led him to IMEB, the International Electroacoustic Music Institute of Bourges, where he did research on electronic music between 1972 and 1973, IRCAM in Paris, and to the Musik/Dia/Licht/Film Galerie in Munich in 1974.

Lorenzo Ferrero has received commissions from numerous festivals and institutions, his works being constantly performed throughout Europe and North America, particularly in Italy, Germany, France, Great Britain, Spain, Finland, Russia, the Czech Republic, and the United States. 

His most popular compositions include the operas Marilyn, La figlia del mago, Salvatore Giuliano, Charlotte Corday, La Conquista, and Risorgimento!, the first Piano Concerto, the Concerto for Violin, Cello,   Piano and Orchestra, the set of six symphonic poems La Nueva España, the song cycle Canzoni d'amore, the Capriccio for Piano and String Orchestra, Parodia, Ostinato, Glamorama Spies, Tempi di quartetto for string quartet, and the ballet Franca Florio, regina di Palermo. In 1986 he  participated in the Prix Italia with his work La fuga di Foscolo. His music is published by Casa Ricordi, Milan.

As an active manager of art events, he has served as artistic director of the Festival Puccini in Torre del Lago (1980–84), "Unione Musicale" in Turin (1983–87), Arena di Verona Festival (1991–94), and the "Musica 2000" fair. In 1999 he co-founded and coordinated the "Festa della Musica", a showcase of classical, jazz and world music held in Milan, and four years later he managed the Ravello Festival. 
 
In 2007 Lorenzo Ferrero was appointed to the board of directors and elected vice-president of SIAE, the Italian Authors and Publishers Association. That same year he published the Manuale di scrittura musicale, a manual which describes the basic rules of correct and elegant music writing from the orthographic as well as the graphic point of view, which is addressed to all composers, musicologists, teachers, students and copy-editors in need of practical advice. In 2008 he translated, edited and published Lo studio dell'orchestrazione, the Italian edition of Samuel Adler's The Study of Orchestration, a landmark orchestration manual.

Lorenzo Ferrero has been professor of composition at Milan Conservatory from 1980 to 2016. His teaching appointments also include positions at St. Mary's College of Maryland and LUISS Business School, a division of LUISS Guido Carli University of Rome. Moreover, as member of the Italian National Union of Composers, Librettists and Authors he co-founded ECSA, the European Composer and Songwriter Alliance, and between 2011 and 2017 he was president of CIAM, the International Council of Music Authors. In 2017, he was appointed honorary president of CIAM.

Lorenzo Ferrero was described in The New Grove Dictionary of Opera as "the most successful opera composer of his generation in Italy" and in The New Penguin Opera Guide as "a principal exponent of the neo-tonal tendencies common to a number of Italian composers of his generation, who has championed a brand of narrative music-theatre that aims to capture a wider audience than that achieved by the heirs of the modernist tradition."

Works

In addition to the original works listed below, Lorenzo Ferrero completed the orchestration of the third version of the opera La rondine by Giacomo Puccini, which was subsequently premiered at Teatro Regio di Torino on 22 March 1994. With a group of six other Italian composers he wrote the Requiem per le vittime della mafia, a collaborative composition for soloists, choir and orchestra on an Italian text by Vincenzo Consolo. The requiem was first performed in the Palermo Cathedral on 27 March 1993. Furthermore, he wrote the music for the Sestriere Alpine World Ski Championships opening ceremony of 1997 including the official anthem, incidental music for stage productions, and a film score. British musicologist David Osmond-Smith described his style as "an unabashed synthesis of classical traditions and pop [...] that never forgets its 19-century precursors."

Opera
 Rimbaud, ou Le Fils du soleil (1978), quasi un melodramma in three acts
 Marilyn (1980), scenes from the '50s in two acts
 La figlia del mago (1981), giocodramma melodioso in two acts
 Mare nostro (1985), comic opera in two acts
 Night (1985), opera in one act
 Salvatore Giuliano (1986), opera in one act
 Charlotte Corday (1989), opera in three acts
 Le Bleu-blanc-rouge et le noir (1989), marionette opera
 La nascita di Orfeo (1996), musical action in one act
 La Conquista (2005), opera in two acts
 Le piccole storie: Ai margini delle guerre (2007), chamber opera in one act
 Risorgimento! (2011), opera in one act

Ballet
 Invito a nozze (1978), ballet
 Lotus Eaters (1985), ballet
 Franca Florio, regina di Palermo (2007), ballet in two acts

Orchestral music
 Ellipse IV (Waldmusik) (1977), for folk ensemble ad libitum
 Romanza seconda (1977), for bassoon and strings
 Arioso (1977), for orchestra and live electronics
 Arioso II (1981), for large orchestra
 Balletto (1981), for orchestra
 My Blues (1982), for string orchestra
 Thema 44 (ad honorem J. Haydn) (1982), for small orchestra
 Ombres (1984), for orchestra and live electronics
 The Miracle (1985), suite for orchestra 
 Intermezzo notturno from Mare nostro (1985), for small orchestra 
 Intermezzo "Portella della Ginestra" from Salvatore Giuliano (1986), for orchestra
 Four Modern Dances (1990), for small orchestra
 Zaubermarsch (1990), for small orchestra
 Concerto for Piano and Orchestra (1991)
 Paesaggio con figura (1994), for small orchestra
 Concerto for Violin, Cello, Piano and Orchestra (1994–95)
 Palm Beach Overture (1995), for orchestra
 Capriccio for Piano and String Orchestra (1996) 
 Three Baroque Buildings (1997), for bassoon, trumpet, and strings
 Championship Suite (1997), for large orchestra
 Storie di neve (1997), music for the Alpine World Ski Championships opening ceremony
 La Nueva España (1992–99), a set of six symphonic poems
 La ruta de Cortés (1992)
 La noche triste (1996)
 Memoria del fuego (1998)
 Presagios (1999)
 El encuentro (1999)
 La matanza del Templo Mayor (1999)
 Rastrelli in Saint Petersburg (2000), for oboe and string orchestra
 Two Cathedrals in the South (2001), for trumpet and string orchestra
 Five Easy Pieces (2002), transcription for orchestra
 Guarini, the Master (2004), for violin and strings
 DEsCH (2006), for oboe, bassoon, piano, and orchestra
 Quattro variazioni su un tema di Banchieri: 2 Agosto. Prima variazione (2008), for organ and orchestra
 Concerto for Piano and Orchestra No. 2 (2009)
 Fantasy Suite No. 2 (2009), for violin and orchestra

Chamber and instrumental music
 Primavera che non vi rincresca (1971), electronic tape piece      
 Ellipse III (1974), for any 4 players/ensembles
 Siglied (1975), for chamber orchestra
 Romanza senza parole (1976), for chamber ensemble
 Adagio cantabile (1977), for chamber ensemble
 Variazioni sulla notte (1980), for guitar
 Respiri (1982), for flute and piano
 Soleils (1982), for harp
 Ellipse (1983), for flute 
 Onde (1983), for guitar
 My Rock (1985), (versions for piano and for big band)
 Empty Stage (1985), for 4 clarinets and piano
 My Blues (1986), for flute and piano
 Passacaglia (1986), for flute, clarinet, and string quartet
 Ostinato  (1987), for 6 violoncelli
 Parodia (1990), for chamber ensemble
 Discanto sulla musica sull'acqua di Handel (1990), for flute, oboe, clarinet, bass clarinet, French horn, and percussion
 Cadenza (1990), for clarinet and marimba
 Musica per un paesaggio (1990), for small orchestra
 Movimento americano (1992), for oboe, clarinet, bassoon, and string quartet
 Ostinato (1993), for two violoncelli and strings
 Portrait (1994), for string quartet
 Seven Seconds (1995), for clarinet, violin, and piano
 Shadow Lines (1995), for bass flute and live electronics
 My Piece of Africa (1996), for violin, viola, violoncello, and contrabass
 Five Easy Pieces (1997), for flute and piano (version of a piano work)
 Tempi di quartetto (1996–98), for string quartet
 Glamorama Spies (1999), for flute, clarinet, violin, violoncello, and piano
 Sonata (2000), for viola and piano 
 Moonlight Sonata (2001), for 5 percussion instruments
 Three Baroque Buildings in a Frame (2002), for flute and string quartet
 Macuilli Mexihcateteouch - Five Aztec Gods (2005), for string quartet 
 Haring at the Exhibition (2005), ambient piece
 Fantasy Suite (2007), for flute, violoncello and piano
 Freedom Variations (2008), for trumpet and chamber ensemble
 Tourists and Oracles (2008), for eleven instruments and piano four-hands  
 Three Simple Songs (2009), for flute, clarinet, violin, violoncello, and piano 
 Venice 1976 (A Parody) (2013), for flute, clarinet, violin, violoncello, and piano
 Country Life (2015) for saxophone and piano
 A Night in Nashville (2015) for saxophone and piano

Piano music

 Aivlys (1977)
 My Rag (1982)
 My Blues (1982)
 My Rock (1983)
 Rock my Tango (1990)
 Five Easy Pieces (1994)
 Seven Portraits of the Same Person (1996)
 Op.111 - Bagatella su Beethoven (2009)

Organ and harpsichord 

 Ellipse II (1975), for harpsichord/clavichord
 A Red Wedding Dress (1998), for organ

Choral and vocal music
 Fawn (1969/70), for voice and live synthesizer 
 Immigrati (1969/70), for voice and live synthesizer
 Ellipse III (1974), for any 4 voices/choruses
 Ghost Tantra (1975), for voice and synthesizer
 Missa brevis (1975), for five voices and two synthesizers
 Le Néant où l'on ne peut arriver (1976), for solo voices, mixed chorus, and orchestra
 Non parto, non resto (1987), for mixed chorus
 Introito, part of the Requiem per le vittime della mafia (1993), for chorus and orchestra
 Night of the Nite (1979), aria from Marilyn for soprano and piano
 Canzoni d'amore (1985), for voice and chamber ensemble
 La fuga di Foscolo (1986), for 4 soloists, speaker, and small orchestra
 Poi andro in America (1986), aria from Salvatore Giuliano for voice and orchestra
 Ninna-nanna (1986), for tenor and piano
 La Conquista (2006), symphonic-choral suite
 Canti polacchi (2010), for female chorus and orchestra
 Senza parole (2012), for mixed chorus

Incidental and theatre music
 Nebbia di latte (1987), for flutes and live electronics
 La cena delle beffe (1988), stage music for Carmelo Bene
 Maschere (1993), for Le Massere by Carlo Goldoni for string quartet
 Lontano dagli occhi (1999), for one actor, 4 voices, and piano quartet 
 Mozart a Recanati (2006), for one actress, 1 voice, string trio, clarinet, and piano

Film score
 Anemia

Books and book contributions
 Ferrero, Lorenzo (2007). Manuale di scrittura musicale. Torino: EDT Srl.
 Ferrero, Lorenzo, ed. (2008). Lo studio dell'orchestrazione. Torino: EDT Srl.
 Capellini, Lorenzo (1987). Nascita di un'opera: Salvatore Giuliano. Bologna: Nuova Alfa Editoriale.
 Ostali, Piero, ed. (1990). Il Piccolo Marat: Storia e rivoluzione nel melodramma verista. Atti del terzo convegno di studi su Pietro Mascagni. Milan: Casa Musicale Sonzogno.
 Harpner, S, ed. (1992). Über Musiktheater: Eine Festschrift. Munich: Ricordi.
 Jacoviello, Marco (1998). Il suono e l'anima: Il paesaggio invisibile del melodramma. Udine: Campanotto.
 Jacoviello, Marco (2015). Al favor della notte... Notturni nel teatro di Mozart. Perugia: Morlacchi Editore.  
 Pozzi, S, ed. (2002). La musica sacra nelle chiese cristiane. Bologna: Alfastudio.
 Donati, P, and Pacetti, E, eds. (2002). C'erano una volta nove oscillatori... Lo studio di fonologia della Rai di Milano nello sviluppo della nuova musica in Italia. Teche. Rome: RAI Teche; Milano: Scuole civiche di Milano, Fondazione di partecipazione, Accademia internazionale della musica, Istituto di ricerca musicale; Rome: RAI-ERI.
 Maurizi, P, ed. (2004). Quattordici interviste sul «nuovo teatro musicale» in Italia. Perugia: Morlacchi Editore.
 Hugony, Fabrizio (2010). Galileo e il segreto dei Maya. Milan: NR.

Discography

See also

 Italian opera
 List of historical opera characters
 Classical music written in collaboration
 DSCH motif
 Spanish conquest of the Aztec Empire
 Music of Italy
 Glamorama
 1985 in music

Notes

References
 Cresti, Renzo (2019). Musica presente. Tendenze e compositori di oggi, pp. 33–39. Lucca: Libreria Musicale Italiana.  
 Holden, Amanda, ed. (2001). The New Penguin Opera Guide. London: Penguin Books. 
 Sadie, Stanley, ed. (1992–2002). The New Grove Dictionary of Opera. London: Macmillan Publishers. 
 Vitelli, Niclo (2016). Un bel dì vedremo: Il festival di Giacomo Puccini. Cronaca di un'incompiuta. Florence: Firenze Leonardo Edizioni.

Further reading
 Anon. (1982–83). "Lorenzo Ferrero "Marilyn"—Anmerkungen zur Oper." In Neuland: Ansätze zur Musik der Gegenwart, edited by Herbert Henck Vol. 3, pp 142–146. Bergisch Gladbach: Neuland Musikverlag Herbert Henck. 
 Arciuli, Emanuele (2006). Rifugio intermedio - Il pianoforte contemporaneo tra Italia e Stati Uniti. Monfalcone: Teatro Comunale.
 Bagnoli, Giorgio, ed. (1993). The La Scala Encyclopedia of the Opera. New York: Simon & Schuster.  
 Baransky, Zygmunt G., West, Rebecca J. (2001). The Cambridge Companion to Modern Italian Culture. Cambridge and New York: Cambridge University Press.  
 Boccadoro, Carlo (2007). Lunario della musica. Einaudi. 
 Budden, Julian (2002). Puccini: His Life and Works. Oxford and New York: Oxford University Press.  
 Bussotti, Sylvano (1982). I miei teatri. Palermo: Edizioni Novecento. 
 Donati, Paolo, and Ettore Pacetti, eds. (2002). C'erano una volta nove oscillatori: lo studio di fonologia della Rai di Milano nello sviluppo della nuova musica in Italia. Teche. Rome: RAI Teche; Milano: Scuole civiche di Milano, Fondazione di partecipazione, Accademia internazionale della musica, Istituto di ricerca musicale; Rome: RAI ERI. 
 Enciclopedia della musica (1996) entry: Lorenzo Ferrero. Turin: UTET. 
 Fearn, Raymond (1998). Italian Opera since 1945. London: Routledge. 
 Gasperini, Nicoletta (1985). "Lorenzo Ferrero" in Panorama, 25 August. 
 Gelli, Piero, ed. (2007). Dizionario dell'Opera 2008 entries: Lorenzo Ferrero, La conquista, Marilyn,  Salvatore Giuliano. Milano: Baldini Castoldi Dalai editore.   
 Gerhartz, Leo Karl. Oper: Aspekte der Gattung. Laaber: Laaber-Verlag. 
 Girardi, Enrico (2000). Il teatro musicale italiano oggi: La generazione della post-avanguardia. Turin: De Sono-Paravia.  
 Gruhn, Wilfried, ed. (1989). Das Projekt Moderne und die Postmoderne: Die neue Tonalität bei Lorenzo Ferrero (by Theo Hirsbrunner). Kassel.  
 Henze, Hans Werner (1983). Die englische Katze: ein Arbeitstagebuch 1978-82. Frankfurt: Fischer Verlag. 
 Killinger, Charles (2005). Culture and Customs of Italy. Westport, CT: Greenwood Press. 
 Lanza, Andrea (1980). Il secondo novecento. Turin: EDT Srl. 
 Larousse Dictionnaire de la musique (2005) entries: Lorenzo Ferrero, Live electronic music. Paris: Larousse. 
 Moliterno, Gino, ed. (2000). Encyclopaedia of Contemporary Italian Culture. London and New York: Routledge.  
 Nelson, Peter, and Stephen Montague (1991). Live Electronics. Chur and Philadelphia: Harwood Academic Publishers.  
 Peyser, Joan, ed. (2006). The Orchestra: A Collection of 23 Essays on its Origins and Transformations. Milwaukee: Hal Leonard Publishing Corporation. 
 Randel, Don Michael, ed. (2003). The Harvard Dictionary of Music. Harvard University Press.    
 Russo, Marco (1988). Moderno, post-moderno, neo-romanticismo: orientamenti di teatro musicale contemporaneo, Il Verri. Vol. 2.
 Schreiber, Ulrich (2005). Opernführer für Fortgeschrittene. Bärenreiter-Verlag. 
 Salzman, Eric, and Thomas Desi (2008). The New Music Theatre. Oxford and New York: Oxford University Press. 
 Stoïanova, Ivanka (2005). Entre détermination et aventure: essais sur la musique de la deuxième moitié du XXème siècle. Paris: L'Hartman. 
 Wignall, Harry James (1990). "Current Trends in Italian Opera." Perspectives of New Music 28, no. 2:312–26.

External links

 
 Casa Ricordi Catalogue
 Casa Ricordi Digital Collection

Interviews
 Interview with Luciano Berio

Living people
1951 births
Musicians from Turin
University of Turin alumni
Italian classical composers
Italian musical theatre composers
Italian opera composers
Male opera composers
Italian opera librettists
Italian ballet composers
Composers for piano
Composers for violin
String quartet composers
Italian film score composers
Italian male film score composers
Academic staff of Milan Conservatory
20th-century classical composers
21st-century classical composers
Postmodern composers
Italian male classical composers
Translators to Italian
21st-century translators
20th-century Italian composers
21st-century Italian composers
20th-century Italian male musicians
21st-century Italian male musicians